Ilan Volkov (born September 8, 1976, Tel Aviv) is an Israeli orchestral conductor.

Biography
Volkov's father, Alexander Volkov, was a concert pianist. He studied with the conductor Mendi Rodan at the Rubin Academy in Jerusalem, before continuing at the Royal Academy of Music in London. At age 19, he was named Young Conductor in Association to the Northern Sinfonia.  He later served as conductor of Young Sinfonia, the youth orchestra of the Northern Sinfonia.  In 1997, he became Principal Conductor of the London Philharmonic Youth Orchestra. In 1999, Seiji Ozawa named Volkov the Assistant Conductor with the Boston Symphony Orchestra.

Volkov first conducted the BBC Scottish Symphony Orchestra (BBC SSO) in 1998.  He became Chief Conductor of the BBC SSO in January 2003, the youngest chief conductor appointed to a BBC orchestra at the time. He was named the Royal Philharmonic Society Young Musician of the Year in 2004, in recognition of his work with the BBC SSO.  In September 2007, the orchestra announced Volkov's departure from the BBC SSO chief conductorship in September 2009.  In December 2008, the BBC SSO announced the appointment of Volkov as its principal guest conductor, to commence after the conclusion of his tenure as chief conductor, with an initial contract of 3 years, with 4 weeks of scheduled guest-conducting appearances.  

In January 2011, the Iceland Symphony Orchestra named Volkov as its 9th chief conductor and music director, effective with the 2011-2012 season, with an initial contract of 3 years.  His initial contract was for 3 years, with 6 weeks of scheduled appearances in his first season and 9 weeks of concerts in subsequent seasons.  Volkov concluded his tenure with the Iceland Symphony Orchestra in August 2014, following the orchestra's debut at The Proms. 

Volkov first guest-conducted the Brussels Philharmonic in March 2021.  He returned for two additional guest-conducting appearances with the orchestra.  In February 2022, the orchestra announced the appointment of Volkov as its next principal guest conductor, effective with the 2022–2023 season.

Volkov has made a speciality of recording long-unperformed or never before recorded works by neglected artists. He himself has spoken of his affinity with music written "between 1909 and the 20s".  Volkov has made several recordings for the Hyperion label.

Volkov and his partner Maya Dunietz have a daughter, Nadia, born in August 2007 in Israel.  In Tel Aviv, Volkov and the jazz musician Assif Tsahar have established the performing venue Levontine 7.

References

External links
 Maestro Arts agency page on Ilan Volkov
 BBC Scottish Symphony Orchestra website, page on affiliated conductos

Israeli conductors (music)
Alumni of the Royal Academy of Music
People from Tel Aviv
Israeli people of Ukrainian-Jewish descent
1976 births
Living people
Jewish classical musicians
21st-century conductors (music)